The 2015 FIM Finnish Speedway Grand Prix was the second race of the 2015 Speedway Grand Prix season. It took place on May 16 at the Ratina Stadium in Tampere, Finland.

Riders 
The Speedway Grand Prix Commission nominated Timo Lahti as the wild card, and Nike Lunna and Jiri Nieminen both as Track Reserves.

Results 
The Grand Prix was won by Nicki Pedersen, who beat Tai Woffinden, Andreas Jonsson and Jarosław Hampel in the final. Despite finishing second, Woffinden top scored in the meeting and became the new world championship leader.

Heat details

The intermediate classification

References

See also 
 motorcycle speedway

2015 Speedway Grand Prix
2015 in Finnish sport